Chalak or Chelak may refer to:

 Chalak, Ardabil
 Chalak, Lahijan, Gilan Province
 Chelak, Rasht, Gilan Province
 Chelak, Uzbekistan
 Chelak, Rajasthan, India